Braniff International Airways Flight 352 was a scheduled domestic flight from William P. Hobby Airport in Houston, Texas, United States, to Dallas Love Field in Dallas; on May 3, 1968, a Lockheed L-188A Electra flying on the route, registration N9707C, broke up in midair and crashed near Dawson, Texas, after flying into a severe thunderstorm. It was carrying 5 crew and 80 passengers; there were no survivors. Among those killed was Texas state representative Joseph Lockridge, the first black man to represent Dallas County in the Texas Legislature. Investigation revealed that the accident was caused by the captain's decision to penetrate an area of heavy weather followed by a structural over-stress and failure of the airframe while attempting recovery from loss of control during a steep 180-degree turn executed in an attempt to escape the weather.

Flight history
Earlier in the day, at 12:40 local time, the crew of the accident flight flew from Dallas to Houston through the same area they were scheduled to fly later on. On that previous flight, a few hours before, they encountered no significant weather along the route. Once they arrived in Houston, there was no record of the crew being briefed about the updated weather by any Weather Bureau or Federal Aviation Administration personnel, or by any Braniff dispatcher or weather office. They did, however, receive hardcopy information about all relevant en route and terminal weather reports and forecasts.

At 16:11, the crew departed William P. Hobby Airport as Braniff Flight 352, a Lockheed L-188A Electra four-engine turboprop, en route to Dallas Love Field. After about 25 minutes into the flight, while cruising at FL200 (about 20,000 feet above mean sea level), the aircraft approached an area of severe thunderstorm activity. The crew requested to descend to 15,000 feet and deviate to the west. Air Traffic Control (ATC) informed the crew that other flights in the area were deviating to the east and suggested they also deviate east, but the Electra crew insisted that the west seemed OK to them on their onboard weather radar: "Three fifty two does it look good (better). On our scope here it looks like to the uh a little just a little bit to the west would do us real fine."

ATC then cleared the flight to descend to 14,000 feet and deviate to the west as they requested. (The westerly deviation would have been shorter and quicker than an easterly one.)

At 16:44 the crew requested and ATC cleared the flight to descend to 5,000 feet. The crew asked ATC if there were any reports of hail in the area, to which ATC replied: "No, you're the closest one that's ever come to it yet ... I haven't been able to, anybody to, well I haven't tried really to get anybody to go through it, they've all deviated around to the east."

At 16:47 the flight encountered an area of severe weather including hail and requested a 180-degree right turn, which ATC immediately approved. While turning to the right in severe turbulence, the bank angle was increased to over 90 degrees, and the nose pitched down to approximately 40 degrees. As the crew attempted to recover from the ensuing steep diving turn, the aircraft experienced acceleration forces of over 4 g, which caused the right wing to fail. The aircraft then broke up at an altitude of 6,750 feet and crashed in flames into the ground at about 16:48, killing all 85 persons on board.

Witnesses said the four-engine turboprop Electra — a modified version of the trouble-plagued Lockheed aircraft that had experienced two wing failure accidents in 1959 and 1960 — had blown up before it hit the ground and pieces "fishtailed" down through sheets of rain. The FBI, however, did not suspect foul play. Cloyce Floyd, postmaster of the little town of Dawson, about a mile from the crash scene, said he was driving along in the rain when he saw an "orange flash." He continued, "I looked over to the left and I could see this red ball of fire hanging back there about the size of the sun. From the glare of the fire I could see the fuselage sort of fishtailing down. Then it hit and exploded."

Rex Owen, a fireman from Mexia, Texas, was among nearly 100 volunteer rescue workers who went to the scene. "The wreckage was scattered all over the place," he said. Rescue worked clogged the muddy roads for hours carrying bodies and parts of bodies from the eerie scene lit by several Klieg lights.

Investigation
The National Transportation Safety Board (NTSB) investigated the accident. The flight data recorder (FDR) and cockpit voice recorder (CVR) were recovered from the wreckage with their data mostly intact, and the cockpit audio was reconstructed and transcribed.

The NTSB correlated the cockpit conversations with the ATC communications transcript and noted that it was the first officer, at the captain's request, who asked ATC if they had received reports of hail in the area and received the response from ATC that they hadn't because other aircraft had "all deviated around to the east." At that point, according to the CVR transcript, the captain advised the first officer: "No, don't talk to him too much. I'm hearing his conversation on this. He's trying to get us to admit (we're makin) big mistake coming through here."

Shortly thereafter, the first officer stated: "... it looks worse to me over there." The crew then requested and received clearance from ATC for the 180-degree turn. The turn became extremely steep, with a bank of over 90 degrees and a nose pitch-down of 40 degrees. As they were trying to recover from the turn, the FDR indicated a peak acceleration of 4.3 g, which the NTSB concluded caused a structural overstress and inflight breakup.

On June 19, 1969, the NTSB issued its final report, which included the following probable cause statement: "Probable Cause: The stressing of the aircraft structure beyond its ultimate strength during an attempted recovery from an unusual attitude induced by turbulence associated with a thunderstorm. The operation in the turbulence resulted from a decision to penetrate an area of known severe weather."

See also
 List of accidents and incidents involving commercial aircraft

References

External links
 Airliners.net Photos of Electra N9707C, in Dallas Love Field
 Corsicana Daily Sun "Dawson Plane Crash Remembered"
 84 Die in Worst Texas Air Disaster May 1968
 Passenger List of Flight 352
 The Crash of Braniff Flight 352: The forgotten Texas air disaster that helped make aviation safer

352
Aviation accidents and incidents in the United States in 1968
1968 in Texas
Airliner accidents and incidents in Texas
Accidents and incidents involving the Lockheed L-188 Electra
Navarro County, Texas
Braniff
May 1968 events in the United States